The 1941 AAA Championship Car season consisted of three races, beginning in Speedway, Indiana on May 30 and concluding in Syracuse, New York on September 1.  There was also one non-championship event in Langhorne, Pennsylvania.  The AAA National Champion was Rex Mays and the Indianapolis 500 winners were Floyd Davis and Mauri Rose.  The National Championship was not held again until 1946, due to World War II.

Schedule and results
All races running on Paved/Dirt Oval.

 Floyd Davis and Mauri Rose shared the drive, but Davis received the National Championship points as the starting driver.

Leading National Championship standings

Final points standings

Note: The points became the car, when not only one driver led the car, the relieved driver became small part of the points. Points for driver method: (the points for the finish place) / (number the lap when completed the car) * (number the lap when completed the driver)

References

See also
 1941 Indianapolis 500

AAA Championship Car season
AAA Championship Car
1941 in American motorsport